The Civil Defence Service was a civilian volunteer organisation in Great Britain during World War II. Established by the Home Office in 1935 as Air Raid Precautions (ARP), its name was officially changed to the Civil Defence Service (CD) in 1941. The Civil Defence Service included the ARP Wardens Service as well as firemen (initially the Auxiliary Fire Service (AFS) and latterly the National Fire Service (NFS)), fire watchers (later the Fire Guard), rescue, first aid post and stretcher parties. Over 1.9 million people served within the CD and nearly 2,400 lost their lives to enemy action.

Organisation
The organisation of civil defence was the responsibility of each local authority. Volunteers were ascribed to different units depending on experience or training. Each local civil defence service was divided into several sections.

Wardens were responsible for local reconnaissance and reporting, and leadership, organisation, guidance and control of the general public. Wardens would also advise survivors of the locations of rest and food centres, and other welfare facilities.
Rescue Parties were required to assess and then access buildings damaged during air raids and retrieve injured or dead people. In addition they would turn off gas, electricity and water supplies, and repair or pull down unsteady buildings.
Medical services included first aid parties who provided on the spot medical assistance. More serious injuries were passed to first aid posts by stretcher parties and to local hospitals by ambulance personnel. If required, bodies could be removed to emergency mortuaries.
Gas Decontamination Teams were kitted out with gas-tight and waterproof protective clothing and were to deal with any gas attacks. They were trained to decontaminate buildings, roads, rail and other material that had been contaminated by liquid or jelly gases.
Report and Control dealt with the stream of information that would be generated during an air raid. A local headquarters would have a controller who would direct rescue, first aid and decontamination teams to the scenes of reported bombing. If local services were deemed insufficient to deal with the incident then the controller could request assistance from surrounding boroughs.
Fire Guards (initially called the Fire Watchers Order in September 1940, then the Fire Watcher Service in January 1941 and then reformed as the Fire Guard in August 1941) were responsible for a designated area/building and required to monitor the fall of incendiary bombs and pass on news of any fires that had broken out to the NFS. They could deal with an individual magnesium electron incendiary bomb by dousing them in buckets of sand, water or by smothering.
Welfare would support the injured and people bombed out of their homes. This would involve finding suitable accommodation, issuing new documentation (ration books, identity cards) and money to buy food.
Messengers would convey information from the site of bombing incidents back to the ARP headquarters. Many messengers were scouts and teenagers equipped with nothing more than a bicycle.

The Women's Voluntary Service (WVS) aided in ARP and observer duties as well as running and operating the mobile canteens and rest centres.

Uniforms and insignia
Initially, in the early part of the war, ARP members had no recognisable uniform. Members would wear civilian clothes but were issued with helmets, armbands and gas masks. The first issue of uniforms in October 1939 was in the form of a blue heavy cotton drill overall (called bluette) that was issued to wardens as well as rescue parties. From February 1941 all CD services were issued with dark blue battledress and trousers for men and a four pocket serge tunic with trousers or skirt for women. A wool beret was also issued to all members. Those not issued with a uniform would be issued with a blue armband with Civil Defence written on it.

From the formation of the ARP until 1939, the badges were made of solid sterling silver, with a crescent-shaped button hole attachment for men and a pin style brooch for women. From 1940 on, the badges were made of a base metal. Civil Defence insignia included a circular breast badge worn on the left pocket incorporating the letters "CD" topped by a king's crown (in yellow on dark blue or black backing). A similar smaller badge with yellow circle around the CD and crown was used for the beret, though a large number used their silver ARP badge on their headwear.

The branch of service a member belonged to was shown on their shoulder titles. Additionally, there were instructor badges and first aid badges that could be worn as well as red chevrons each chevron for 12 months' service in the CD). 

Rank was indicated by yellow bars 2½ inches × ¼ or ¾ inches) or chevrons:

Members of the various services were issued with service gas masks and steel helmets ARP service personnel were issued with Mk. II British helmets. These were often not made to the same level as issued to soldiers to reduce costs. These helmets, which had less resistance to ballistic impact, would have small holes drilled in the rim to show they were not for front line use. Depending on the role of the person the helmet would be marked with a letter or letters to easily allow others to ascertain their role at an incident.

 W for wardens (some warden/fire guards had W/FG). Rank within the warden service was denoted by a white helmet and black bands.
 R for rescue services (later HR and LR were used for heavy and light rescue parties)
 FAP for first aid parties
 SP for stretcher parties (to carry injured from incidents)
 A for ambulance drivers
 M for messenger/runner

Fire Guard officers wore the military helmet whilst lower ranking members were issued with the Zuckerman helmets) with "FG" for Fire Guard written on it. There were many variations in abbreviations, style of letter and colour.

Disbanded

The Civil Defence Service was disbanded on 2 May 1945. On 10 June 1945, before His Majesty King George VI, a farewell parade with representatives of all the Civil Defence Services from across Great Britain took place in Hyde Park, London. Many of the duties of the service were later revived as part of the Civil Defence Corps in 1949.

See also
 Air Raid Precautions
 Civil Defence Corps
 Zuckerman helmet

References

 Brown, Mike. Put That Light Out!: Britain's Civil Defence Services at War 1935–45. Stroud: Sutton Publishing, 1999. .
 Essex-Lopresti, Tim. "A Brief History of Civil Defence", Published by the Civil Defence Association, 2005.

External links

 Civil Defence Association
 A Brief History of Civil Defence

1935 establishments in the United Kingdom
History of firefighting
20th century in the United Kingdom
Organizations established in 1935
1945 disestablishments in the United Kingdom
Organizations disestablished in 1945
Civil defence organisations based in the United Kingdom
United Kingdom home front during World War II